This article is about the ice cream varieties around the world.

Argentina

While industrial ice cream exists in Argentina and can be found in supermarkets, restaurants or kiosks, and ice cream pops are sold on some streets and at the beaches, the most traditional Argentine helado (ice cream) is very similar to Italian gelato, rather than US-style ice cream, and it has become one of the most popular desserts in the country. Among the most famous manufacturers are "Freddo," "Persicco," "Chungo", "Cremolatti" and "Munchi's," all of them located in Buenos Aires. Each city has its own heladerías (ice cream parlours) which offer different varieties of creamy and water-based ice creams, including both standard and regional flavours. There are hundreds of flavors but Argentina's most traditional and popular one is dulce de leche, which has become popular abroad, especially in the US.

There are two kinds of heladerías in Argentina: the cheaper ones which sell ice cream with artificial ingredients (like Helarte, Pirulo, Sei Tu and the largest one, Grido), and the ones that sell helado artesanal, made with natural ingredients and usually distinguished by a logo featuring an ice cream cone and the letters HA. There are no regulations in Argentina regarding the amount of milk an ice cream can have. In fact, all ice cream parlors serve both cream-based and water-based ice cream (helado a la crema and helado al agua respectively). Instead, the distinctions are made according to the quality of the ingredients.

A standard Argentine cone or cup contains two different flavours of ice cream. In addition to these, most heladerías offer ice-cream-based desserts like Bombón Suizo (Swiss Bonbon: chocolate-covered chantilly ice cream filled with dulce de leche and sprinkled with nuts), Bombón Escocés (Scottish Bonbon: same as the Swiss Bonbon, only with chocolate ice-cream and white chocolate topping), Cassata (strawberry, vanilla and chocolate ice cream) and Almendrado (almond ice cream sprinkled with almond praline).

Australia and New Zealand

Per capita, Australians and New Zealanders are among the leading ice cream consumers in the world, eating 18 litres and 20 litres each per year respectively, behind the United States where people eat 23 litres each per year.
Brands include Tip Top, Streets, Peters, Sara Lee, New Zealand Natural, Cadbury, Baskin-Robbins and Bulla Dairy Foods. A popular ice cream flavour in New Zealand, Australia and Japan that originated in New Zealand is hokey pokey.

China, Hong Kong, Macao,
Besides the popular flavour such as vanilla, chocolate, coffee, mango and strawberry, many Chinese ice-cream manufacturers also introduced other traditional flavours such as black sesame, red beans.

In recent years, Hong Kong, Macao dessert houses also serve ice-cream moon cake during the Mid-Autumn festival (moon festival).

Fried ice cream is served at street food stalls in Beijing.

Cuba

In Cuba, ice cream is sold at the state-run Coppelia chain of ice cream parlors. Coppelia was founded in 1966 by Fidel Castro, his aim to introduce his love of dairy products to the Cuban masses and to prove that a communist enterprise could provide better ice cream and flavor selection than American brands. In the capital Havana, the Coppelia parlor is an architectural icon and a major landmark and meeting place in the city.  In 2012, the Cuban newspaper Trabajadores exposed the short supply, poor service, and melted ice cream served at the landmark.

Finland
The first ice cream manufacturer in Finland was the Italian Magi family, who opened the Helsingin jäätelötehdas in 1922 and Suomen Eskimo Oy. Other manufacturers soon spawned, like Pietarsaaren jäätelötehdas (1928–2002).

Finland's first ice cream bar opened at the Lasipalatsi in 1936, and at the same time another manufacturer, Maanviljelijäin Maitokeskus started their production.

Today, the two largest ice cream manufacturers are Ingman and Nestlé (who bought Valiojäätelö). Finland is also the leading consumer of ice cream in Europe, with 13.7 litres per person in 2003.

France
In 1651,François Procope opened an ice cream café in Paris and the product became so popular that during the next 50 years another 250 cafés opened in Paris. Some people eat heart or log shaped cakes made of ice cream on New Year's Eve or New Year's Day.

Places who make and sell ice cream in France are called glaciers. They sell ice-creams, called glaces in French, of different flavours and some of them are typically French. One of the most traditional is the glace plombières invented in 1815 and still very popular in family events like weddings. The glace à la Chantilly made with chantilly are also very common and were created during the 17th century. Another traditional ice-cream is the fontainebleau created in the 18th century near Paris. Nowadays French ice-creams with a base of fromage blanc are found especially in the country side were farmers make artisanal fromage blanc. 

Here are some traditional French recipes that we can find in glaciers: 

Café liégeois: sweetened coffee, coffee-flavoured ice cream and chantilly cream. 

Peach Melba: peaches and raspberry sauce with vanilla ice cream. 

Bombe glacée:  ice cream dessert frozen in a spherical mould. 

Dame blanche: vanilla ice cream with whipped cream, and warm molten chocolate. 

Poire belle Hélène:  pears poached in sugar syrup served with vanilla ice cream and chocolate syrup. 

Colonel: lemon sorbet with vodka. 

Plombières:  almond extract, kirsch, and candied fruit. 

Vacherin glacé: a layer or two of meringue, topped with vanilla ice cream and raspberry sorbet and finished off with a Chantilly cream. 

Omelette norvégienne: sponge cake, ice cream and meringue, hot on the outside and iced on the inside.

Germany

One of the first well known Italian ice cream parlors (Eisdiele) was founded in Munich in 1879 and run by the Sarcletti family. This traditional family business was handed from generation to generation ever since. Since the 1920s, when many Italians immigrated and set up business, the traditional ice cream parlors became very popular. A popular German ice cream dish is Spaghettieis, created by Dario Fontanella in the 1960s and made to look like a plate of spaghetti. 

About 80% percent of the ice cream sold in Germany is produced industrially, with the leading manufacturer being Unilever. About 17% is produced commercially and the remaining 3% is produced for the soft serve sector. In 2013, Germany had the largest market for ice cream in Europe at $2.7 billion revenue.

Ghana
In 1962, the Ghanaian treat FanIce was created by the Fan Milk Limited Company. FanIce comes in strawberry, chocolate, and vanilla. FanMilk also makes additional products, though FanIce is the closest to Western ice cream. Pouches of FanIce and other FanMilk products can be bought from men on bikes equipped with chill boxes in any moderately sized town, and in cities large enough for grocery stores. FanMilk can also be bought in tubs for eating at home. In 2006, FanMilk was voted best ice-cream in the world.

Greece

Ice cream in its modern form, or pagotó, was introduced in Greece along its development in Europe in the beginning of the 20th century. Earlier than that, ice treats have been enjoyed in the country since ancient times. During the 5th century BC, ancient Greeks ate snow mixed with honey and fruit in the markets of Athens. The father of modern medicine, Hippocrates, encouraged his Ancient Greek patients to eat ice "as it livens the lifejuices and increases the well-being." In the 4th century BC, it was well known that a favorite treat of Alexander the Great was snow ice mixed with honey and nectar. In the modern Day Greek ice cream has been heavily influenced by Turkish Ice cream Dondurma thus the name used to be called Dudurmas but, because of Greco-Turkish relations most Turkish related foods are coined a more Greek idiom. Greek ice cream recipes have some unique flavours such as Pagoto Kaimaki, made from mastic-resin which gives it an almost chewy texture, and Salepi, used as a thickening agent to increase resistance to melting, both giving a unique taste to the ice cream; Pagoto Elaeolado me syko, made of olive oil and figs; Pagoto Kataifi cocoa, made from the shredded filo dough pastry that resembles angel's hair pasta, similar to vermicelli but much thinner; and Pagoto Mavrodaphne, made from a Greek dessert wine. Fruity Greek Sweets of the Spoon are usually served as toppings with Greek-inspired ice cream flavors.

India

India is one of the largest producers of ice cream in the world, but most of its ice cream is consumed domestically. India also has an ice cream dish known as "Kulfi" or "Matka Kulfi", which is famous in small towns and villages. Major brands are AMUL, Havmor, Kwality Wall's, Vadilal, Mother Dairy, Sadguru Dadarwale etc. In recent times, many domestic ice cream companies have opened their exclusive outlets in metros and several international ice-cream companies also started their operation in India.

Indonesia
In Indonesia there is a type of traditional ice cream called "Es Puter" or "stirred ice cream". It's made from some ingredients: coconut milk, pandan leaves and sugar, with flavouring: avocado, jackfruit, durian, palm sugar, chocolate, red bean, mung bean or other various flavors.

Iran
Fālūde (Persian: فالوده) or Pālūde (Persian: پالوده) is a Persian sorbet made of thin vermicelli noodles frozen with corn starch, rose water, lime juice, and often ground pistachios. It is a traditional dessert in Iran and Afghanistan. It was brought to the Indian subcontinent during the Mughal period. The faloodeh of Shiraz is famous.

Faloodeh is one of the earliest forms of frozen desserts, having existed as early as 400 BC. Ice was brought down from high mountains and stored in tall refrigerated buildings called yakhchals, which were kept cool by windcatchers.

There is also a drink called faloodeh, but it is made using other ingredients.

 Bastani
 Sorbet

Italy

Italian ice cream or Gelato as it is known, is a traditional and a popular dessert in Italy. Much of the production is still hand-made and flavoured by each individual shop in "produzione propria" gelaterias. Gelato is made from whole milk, sugar, sometimes eggs, and natural flavourings. Gelato typically contains 7-8% fat. Before the cone became popular for serving ice cream, in English speaking countries, Italian street vendors would serve the ice cream in a small glass dish referred to as a "penny lick" or wrapped in waxed paper and known as a hokey-pokey (possibly a corruption of the Italian "ecco un poco" - "here is a little"). Some of the most known artisanal gelato machine makers are Italian companies Carpigiani, Crm-Telme, Corema-Telme, Technogel, Cattabriga and high capacity industrial plants made by Catta 27 and Cogil and Teknoice.

Japan

Ice cream is  a popular dessert in Japan, with almost two in five adults eating some at least once a week. From 1999 through 2006, the most popular flavors in Japan have been vanilla, chocolate, matcha (powdered green tea), and strawberry. Other notable popular flavours are milk, caramel, and azuki (red bean). Azuki is particularly favored by people in their 50s and older.
 Kakigori

Laos
A typical variety is Laotian vanilla ice cream made from pandan ("Laotian vanilla").

Mexico

In Mexico, nieve is a type of ice cream that is made from fruit juice with a water base rather than milk like in other countries.

Norway
It is known that the Italian Giovanni Zazzera made and sold "iscrem" in Stavanger from 1910. He had been living in Oslo for five years before that, and could therefore have sold ice cream in Norway as early as 1905.

Pakistan
Pakistan's most popular ice cream brands include OMORÉ, the products of which are exported to Europe and America, Igloo and the British company Wall's Beside these other large ice cream brands from Pakistan include Eat More Ice Cream and Yummy. These companies receive most of their profit from within the country. Pakistani Peshawari ice cream is very famous in South Asia and Middle East.

The most popular flavours in Pakistan are Pista, Qulfi (spelt also as "Qulfa", and in Punjabi with a "K-"), Vanilla and Chocolate.

Philippines

Sorbetes is a Philippine version for common ice cream usually peddled from carts that roam streets in the Philippines. This should not be confused with the known sorbet. It is also commonly called 'dirty ice cream' because it is sold along the streets exposing it to pollution and that the factory where it comes from is usually unknown; though it is not really "dirty" as the name implies. It is usually served with small wafer or sugar cones and recently, bread buns. Popular ice cream flavors in the Philippines include ube ice cream made from ube (purple yam) and queso ice cream made from cheese.

Spain
Ice cream, in the style of Italian gelato, can be found in many cafes or specialty ice cream stores throughout Spain. Usually the flavours reflect local tastes like nata, viola, crema catalana, or tiramisu.

There are also industrial producers like Frigo (owned by Unilever), Camy (later merged into Nestlé), Avidesa, Menorquina, many of them are part of transnational groups. The industrial producers also serve ice cream sandwiches and polos, ice cream on a stick, such as Magnum, sometimes with whimsical shapes like the foot-shaped Frigopié.

Unlike in Northern Europe, ice cream is consumed mostly in summer. Hence, some ice cream stores become hot-chocolate cafés in winter.

Syria

Booza ( in Arabic: "milk ice cream", also called "Arabic ice cream") is a mastic-based ice cream.  It is elastic, sticky, and resistant to melting in the hotter climates of the Arab world, where it is most commonly found.

The ice cream is usually and traditionally made with an ingredient called sahlab  or salep, which provides it with the ability to resist melting. Salep is also a primary ingredient in the Turkish version of this style of ice cream called dondurma.

Turkey

Dondurma (in Turkish: Maraş dondurması, meaning "the ice cream of the city of Maraş", also called Dövme dondurma, meaning "battered ice cream") is a Turkish mastic ice cream.  It is similar to the Syrian dessert booza.

Dondurma typically includes the ingredients cream, whipped cream, salep, mastic, and sugar. It is believed to originate from the city and region of Maraş and hence also known as Maraş ice cream.

United Kingdom
In the United Kingdom, 14 million adults buy ice cream as a treat, in a market worth £1.3 billion (according to a report produced in September 2009). A product may be sold as "ice cream" if it contains 5 per cent fat and not less than 2.5 per cent milk protein, but may contain non-milk vegetable fats and oils, usually hydrogenated palm kernel oil, a rule that is more permissive than many other countries. Only true ice cream made only with milk fats (though not necessarily cream) can be described as dairy ice cream, and many companies make sure that dairy is prominently displayed on their packaging and advertising.

United States

In the United States, ice cream made with just cream, sugar, and a flavouring (usually fruit) is sometimes referred to as "Philadelphia style" ice cream. Ice creams made with eggs, usually in the form of frozen custards, are sometimes called "French" ice creams or traditional ice cream.

American federal labeling standards require ice cream to contain a minimum of 10% milk fat (about 7 grams (g) of fat per 1/2 cup [120 mL] serving), 20% total milk solids by weight, to weigh no less than 4.5 pounds per gallon (in order to put a limit on replacing ingredients with air), and to contain less than 1.4% egg yolk solids. Federal government regulations pertaining to the process of making ice cream, allowable ingredients, and standards, may be found in Part 135 of Title 21 of the Code of Federal Regulations.

Americans consume about 23 liters of ice cream per person per year — the most in the world. As a foodstuff it is deeply ingrained into the American psyche and has been available in America since its founding in 1776: there are records of Thomas Jefferson serving it as a then-expensive treat to guests at his home in Monticello. In American supermarkets it is not uncommon for ice cream and related products to take up a wall full of freezers.  All different kinds of ice cream fill the walls with strawberry, chocolate, vanilla, among other flavors.

Although chocolate, vanilla, and strawberry are the traditional favorite flavors of ice cream, and once enjoyed roughly equal popularity, vanilla has grown to be the most popular, most likely because of its use as a topping for fruit based pies and its use as the key ingredient for milkshakes. According to the International Ice Cream Association (1994), supermarket sales of ice cream break down as follows: vanilla, 28%; fruit flavours, 15%; nut flavours, 13.5%; candy mix-in flavours, 12.5%; chocolate, 8%; cake and cookie flavours, 7.5%; Neapolitan, 7%; and coffee/mocha, 3%. Other flavours combine to make 5.5%. Sales in ice cream parlors are more variable, as new flavours come and go, but about three times as many people call vanilla their favorite compared to chocolate, the runner-up.

References

External links
The History of Ice Cream in Thailand 
Largest Ice Cream Saloon in Argentina

Ice cream
Human geography